Tadeusz Stefan Lewandowski (6 January 1944 – 10 July 2021) was a Polish Law and Justice politician who served in the Sejm (1997–2001 and 2005–2007).

References

1944 births
2021 deaths
Polish politicians
Polish city councillors
Members of the Polish Sejm 1991–1993
Members of the Senate of Poland 1997–2001
Members of the Senate of Poland 2005–2007
Law and Justice politicians
People from Tarnopol Voivodeship
Solidarity (Polish trade union) activists
Recipients of Cross of Freedom and Solidarity
Recipients of the Cross of Merit (Poland)